Saattai is a 2012 Indian Tamil-language drama film written and directed by M. Anbazhagan. The film features Samuthirakani and Thambi Ramaiah in pivotal roles. The film's soundtrack and background score were composed by D. Imman. The shooting took place in NLC and Thiruvannamalai. The film is the first installment of the film series and was followed by a spin-off, Appa (2016), and a sequel Adutha Saattai (2019). The movie was officially remade in Kannada in 2020 as Drona.

Plot
Dayalan (Samuthirakani) is a newly appointed teacher of a government school in Vanthaarangudi village near Thiruvannamalai city. He is unhappy with the education system and is also worried about the pitiable condition of education of government schools. After joining the school, he tries to change the school's environment. This is not welcome by Singaperumal (Thambi Ramaiah), who is Assistant Head Master (AHM). Dayalan's decision for the change does not go well with the other teachers and students, but his good moves were slowly noticed by Pandian (Junior Balaiah). Slowly, Dayalan gets popular among the class students. In between, there is love between Pazhanimuthu (Yuvan) and Arivazhagi (Mahima Nambiar). Pazhani's father is also a teacher in the same school. Singaperumal was waiting for a turn to take revenge on Dayalan. In these situation, Arivazhagi was sexually abused by somebody. Singaperumal files a case against Dayalan as a culprit. After Arivazhagi opens the statement to the police that another teacher is her abuser, Dayalan was released. Dayalan organizes an inter-school competition between schools. Dayalan's school gets first place because of Arivazhagi's and Pazhani's hard work. After that, Dayalan gets attacked by mobs arranged by Singaperumal. Dayalan gets admitted in the hospital. All of the students and teachers go to the hospital to see him and they were denied to see him by the hospital authorities as he is in very critical condition. Then arrives his wife and inspires the students to study for the coming exams. Students study well and they top their district, and the movie ends with Dayalan giving the responsibility of HM to Singaperumal, who reforms and apologizes to him. The movie ends with Dayalan going to the next village to reform another government school.

Cast

 Samuthirakani as Dayalan
 Thambi Ramaiah as M. Singaperumal
 Yuvan as Pazhanimuthu
 Mahima Nambiar as Arivazhagi
 Junior Balaiah as Pandian
 Swasika as Mrs. Dayalan
 Pandi as Murugan
 Prem as Private School Coach 
 Ravi as Pazhani's father and working staff
 Hello Kandasamy as Deaf man

Soundtrack

The music for the film is by D. Imman. Yugabharathi has penned the lyrics.

Release
The satellite rights of the film were sold to STAR Vijay.

Critical reception
Sify's critic described the film as a "decent entertainer which harps loudly on the message it wants to convey", noting that director M Anbazhgan "has neatly worked the film around [Samuthira]kani’s character but at times it becomes too preachy and sentimental". M. Suganth from The Times of India gave it 4 out of 5 and claimed that Saattai was a "commercial potboiler dressed up as arty fare". The reviewer further wrote: "Anbazhagan's intentions are quite commendable [...] but the sad thing is that he goes about this task with less subtlety and more sermonizing, with the result that the scenes where he wishes to make a point come across as totally preachy". Similarly, Malathi Rangarajan from The Hindu wrote: "The aim is lofty, the theme, noble. It is in execution that director Anbazhagan falters a little". She concluded that the film was "at times obviously sermonising" but "still [...] worthy of notice". Behindwoods's reviewer gave it 2 out of 5 and noted:  "The preachy dialogues in the film are what students listen to in real life. This is probably why the film fails to make the intended impact as there is nothing out of the box".

Sequel

Spin-off

In September 2015, Samuthirakani chose to postpone the production of his Kitna, after the lead actress Dhansika got an offer to appear in Pa. Ranjith's Kabali (2016). He chose instead to use his time directing and producing a sequel to his earlier film, Saattai (2012), and revealed that the film would be titled Appa. He revealed that the film would bear no resemblance to the first film, but would be a spiritual sequel and would revolve around the education system like the previous film. He initially approached Anbazhagan to direct the film, but the director's commitments to making Rupai produced by Prabhu Solomon, meant that Samuthirakani directed the film himself. Samuthirakani also revealed that the film's plot line had been taken from a real-life incident, which happened when choosing a school for his son.

Awards

References

External links
 
 

2012 films
Films about the education system in India
2010s Tamil-language films
Films about educators
Films set in schools
2012 drama films